Sofia Curtis is a fictional character on the CBS crime drama, CSI: Crime Scene Investigation, portrayed by British actress Louise Lombard.

Background
Sofia was introduced in the season five episode "Formalities".  It is later explained in the season six episode "Bodies in Motion" that, though she qualified to become a detective, the sheriff "pulled her papers" and assigned her to CSI due to her lab skills.  Due to a struggle in office politics, Conrad Ecklie demoted her from acting day shift supervisor (season 5 episode "Mea Culpa") to night shift; she subsequently thought about quitting. Gil Grissom talked her into staying, and in season six she resumed her original career path and returned to police work as a detective, like her mother.  She originally took a position in Boulder City, but transferred back to Las Vegas in the first episode of season six.  In the two-part episode "A Bullet Runs Through It", she believes that she may have accidentally shot and killed Officer Daniel Bell in a wild shoot-out with drug dealers.  The shooting causes her great anxiety and emotional stress, but forensic investigation eventually proved that Captain Jim Brass was the accidental shooter (the officer had unwittingly stood up in Brass's line of fire). Later, Curtis is horrified to discover that she had actually watched an undercover cop die on camera from carbon monoxide poisoning. Though she takes it more calmly than the incident with Officer Bell, she still feels responsible for the officer's death (season 7 episode "Monster in the Box").

At the beginning of the seventh season, Sofia becomes a main cast member. In the eighth season, she was replaced by David Hodges, played by Wallace Langham. In the season 8 premiere, however, she is listed as a special guest star. She returned in the season eleven episode "Father of the Bride", in which she is now a Deputy Chief and Captain Brass's boss.

Relationships 
In the series, the character's mother is a captain in the Las Vegas Police Department; she has implied that her mother disapproves of the sheriff essentially drafting her to be a CSI and that she aspires to live up to her mother's reputation ("Bodies in Motion").

Sofia seemed romantically interested in Gil Grissom in season five.  They had dinner together ("Unbearable"), but ultimately their relationship has remained platonic. At one point Sara sees Sofia and Grissom working and laughing together and appears to be jealous.

Despite early tension, she and Sara Sidle often work together in the field.  They argued over Sofia confiding in Gil Grissom about her sense of guilt in the season six episode "A Bullet Runs Through It".  Sara pointed out that legally, Sofia should not discuss the case with Gil, who was investigating, while Sofia felt she had no one else to whom she could turn.  However, they are friendly in subsequent episodes.

CSI: Crime Scene Investigation characters
Fictional Las Vegas Police Department detectives
Television characters introduced in 2004